Beniamino Maggio (10 August 1907 - 6 September 1990) was an Italian actor.

Born in Naples into a family of actors, Maggio debuted on stage as a child, as the sidekick of the comedian Serafino Mastracchio, and he slowly built a reputation in the Neapolitan avanspettacolo between the 1930s and 1940s.  He made his film debut in 1942 and had a very prolific career even if often cast in character roles. An actor characterized by improvisation skills, described as a "mix between Buster Keaton and Angelo Musco", Maggio often worked on stage with his brothers and sisters Dante, Enzo, Pupella and Rosalia. 

Maggio died from complications of a stroke that had hit him while on stage alongside his two sisters Pupella and Rosalia.

Selected filmography

 Captain Demonio (1950)
 Ha fatto tredici (1951)
 Red Moon (1951)
 The Two Sergeants (1951)
 Miracle in Viggiù (1951)
 Melody of Love (1952)
 Rosalba, la fanciulla di Pompei (1952)
 Naples Sings (1953)
 Love Song (1954)
 Letter from Naples (1954)
 Tragic Ballad (1954)
 Naples Is Always Naples (1954)
 Vendicata! (1955)
 New Moon (1955)
 La sposa (1958)
 Kill or Be Killed (1966)
 La pagella (1980)

References

External links 
 

1907 births
1990 deaths
Italian male film actors
Male actors from Naples
Italian male television actors
Italian male stage actors
20th-century Italian male actors